{{chembox
| Verifiedfields = changed
| Watchedfields = changed
| verifiedrevid = 458266470
| ImageFile = Pinacidil structure.svg
| ImageSize = 
| IUPACName = N-cyano-''N-pyridin-4-yl-N''-(1,2,2-trimethylpropyl)guanidine
| OtherNames =
|Section1=
|Section2=
|Section6=
|Section7=
}}Pinacidil is a cyanoguanidine drug that opens ATP-sensitive potassium channels producing peripheral vasodilatation of arterioles. It reduces blood pressure and peripheral resistance and produces fluid retention.

Synthesis

Condensation of 4-isothiocyanotopyridine [76105-84-5] (1) and 3,3-dimethyl-2-butanamine [3850-30-4] (2) gives thiourea [67027-06-9] (3). Treatment of that intermediate with a mixture of triphenylphosphine, carbon tetrachloride, and triethylamine leads to the unsymmetrical carbodiimide, CID:20501933 (4'). Addition of cyanamid affords pinacidil (5''').

References

External links
 

Potassium channel openers
4-Pyridyl compounds
Cyanamides